The Tupolev ANT-20 Maxim Gorky (sometimes romanized as Maksim Gorki) was a Soviet eight-engine aircraft, the largest in the world during the 1930s. Its wingspan was similar to that of a modern Boeing 747, and was not exceeded until the  wingspan Douglas XB-19 heavy bomber prototype first flew in 1941.

Overview 
The ANT-20 was designed by Andrei Tupolev, using German engineer Hugo Junkers' original all-metal aircraft design techniques from 1918. It was constructed between 4 July 1933 and 3 April 1934, and was one of two aircraft of its kind built by the Soviets. The aircraft was named after Maxim Gorky and dedicated to the 40th anniversary of his literary and public activities. The ANT-20 was the largest known aircraft to have used the Junkers aviation firm's design philosophy of corrugated sheet metal for many of the airframe's key components, especially the corrugated sheet metal skinning of the airframe.

The Maxim Gorky was meant as the flagship of the Maxim Gorky propaganda squadron — Maxim Gorky Agiteskadril — which flew around the Soviet Union promoting the aims and achievements of Soviet Communism. For this purpose, it was equipped with a powerful radio set known as the "Voice from the sky" ("Голос с неба", Golos s neba), printing machinery, a library, radio broadcasting equipment, a photographic laboratory and a film projector with sound for showing films in flight. In a first in aviation the aircraft was equipped with a ladder which would fold on itself to become part of the floor.

The aircraft was the first to use both direct current and alternating current. The aircraft could be dismantled and transported by rail if needed. The aircraft set several carrying-capacity world records and is also the subject of a 1934 painting by Vasily Kuptsov, which is now in the collection of the Russian Museum at Saint Petersburg.

1935 Maxim Gorky crash 

On 18 May 1935, the Maxim Gorky (pilots – I. V. Mikheyev and I. S. Zhurov) and three more aircraft (a Tupolev ANT-14, R-5 and I-5) took off for a demonstration flight over Moscow. The main purpose of the other three aircraft flying so close was to make evident the difference in size. The accompanying I-5 biplane piloted by Nikolai Blagin had performed two loop manoeuvres around the Maxim Gorky. On the third loop, they collided. The Maxim Gorky crashed into a low-rise residential neighbourhood west of present-day Sokol metro station. Forty-five people were killed in the crash, including the fighter pilot as well as both crew members and the 33 passengers on the Maxim Gorky, and an additional nine people on the ground.

ANT-20bis 

A replacement aircraft, designated ANT-20bis had begun production the following year and first flew in 1938. It was largely identical in design but with six more-powerful Mikulin AM-34FRNV engines. In December 1940, the aircraft was re-engined with two slightly more powerful Mikulin AM-35 engines in the inner positions (numbers three and four). This aircraft, designated PS-124 and registered CCCP-L760, served with Aeroflot on transport routes in Russia and Uzbekistan.

Operators

Specifications

See also

References

External links

 (formerly linked video clip is no longer accessible)

ANT-20
Eight-engined push-pull aircraft
1930s Soviet airliners
1930s Soviet special-purpose aircraft
Aviation accidents and incidents in the Soviet Union
Aviation accidents and incidents in 1935
Aviation accidents and incidents in 1942
Aircraft first flown in 1934